Ahlaf is a town in Benslimane Province, Casablanca-Settat, Morocco. According to the 2004 census it had a population of 12,841.

References

Populated places in Benslimane Province
Rural communes of Casablanca-Settat